RAJU is a since defunct MMA promotion, which in the conceptive grassroots of Baltic MMA, was the highest level of Estonian mixed martial arts. There were 2 competitions in a year. The last competition, Raju 14, was held in Tartu A. Le Coq Sports Hall on 13 October 2012.

Fighter divisions

Fighters could participate at MMA Raju in one of the three following divisions: amateur (C-class), semi-professional (B-class) and professional (A-class).

In all three classes, the following actions are considered fouls: headbutts, biting, grabbing hair, inserting fingers into orifices or wounds, attacks to the groin, small joint manipulation, attacks to the back of the head and spine, attacking and grabbing the throat, clawing and pinching, grabbing the collar-bone, direct attacks to joints, 12-to-6 elbow strikes, kicks and knees to the head of a grounded opponent, intentionally throwing the opponent onto the head or neck, throwing the opponent out of the cage, spitting at the opponent, grabbing the fence, swearing.

For semi-professionals (B-class) the following additional actions are forbidden: elbow and forearm strikes to the head, kicking a grounded opponent in the head.

For amateurs (C-class) the following additional actions are forbidden: elbow and forearm strikes, knees to the head, striking a grounded opponent to the head, kicking a grounded opponent, kidney strikes, throws with only a head-hold, leglocks that twist the knee, submissions that twist the spine.

There were two separate events held each time – amateur event during the day (C-class) and main event in the evening with professional fights.

Weight classes
Prior to Raju 8, weigh-ins took place on the day of the competition. At Raju 8, weigh-ins for the evening event took place one day before the event.
 Flyweight (-125 lb, -56.7 kg)
 Bantamweight (-135 lb, -61.2 kg)
 Featherweight (-145 lb, -65.8 kg)
 Lightweight (-155 lb, -70.3 kg)
 Welterweight (-170 lb, -77.1 kg)
 Middleweight (-185 lb, -83.9 kg)
 Light Heavyweight (-205 lb, -93.0 kg)
 Heavyweight (-265 lb, -120.2 kg)
 Super Heavyweight (+265 lb, +120.2 kg)

Events

Social responsibility 

Before MMA Raju 7, the organizers established a charity program called "Donate blood with Raju fighters". In this program, mixed martial artists themselves and fans of the league donate blood together during one day, which occurs roughly one month before the event. For Raju 7, roughly 40 people donated blood. Before Raju 8, 85 people donated their blood, including Estonian rapper G-Enka. Before Raju X, over 200 people donated blood.

References

External links

List of Events on Sherdog

Mixed martial arts organizations
Martial arts in Estonia